Psidium pedicellatum is a species of plant in the family Myrtaceae. It is a fruiting shrub or small tree endemic to Ecuador.

References

pedicellatum
Endemic flora of Ecuador
Endangered plants
Taxonomy articles created by Polbot
Plants described in 1956